The Good Neighbor policy was the foreign policy of the administration of United States President Franklin Roosevelt towards Latin America. Although the policy was implemented by the Roosevelt administration, President Woodrow Wilson had previously used the term, but subsequently went on to justify U.S. involvement in the Mexican Revolution and occupation of Haiti. Senator Henry Clay had coined the term Good Neighbor in the previous century. President Herbert Hoover turned against interventionism and developed policies that Roosevelt perfected.

The policy's main principle was that of non-intervention and non-interference in the domestic affairs of Latin America. It also reinforced the idea that the United States would be a "good neighbor" and engage in reciprocal exchanges with Latin American countries. Overall, the Roosevelt administration expected that this new policy would create new economic opportunities in the form of reciprocal trade agreements and reassert the influence of the United States in Latin America; however, many Latin American governments were not convinced.

Background
In the early 20th century, the United States periodically intervened militarily in Latin American nations to protect its interests, particularly the commercial interests of the US business community. After the Roosevelt Corollary of 1904, whenever the United States felt its debts were not being repaid in a prompt fashion, its citizens' business interests were being threatened, or its access to natural resources was being impeded, military intervention or threats were often used to coerce the respective government into compliance. This made many Latin Americans wary of U.S. presence in their region and subsequently hostilities grew towards the United States.

For example, President Wilson landed U.S. troops in Mexico in 1914, in Haiti in 1915, in the Dominican Republic in 1916, in Mexico a second time in 1916, and in Mexico several additional times before Wilson left office, in Cuba in 1917, and in Panama in 1918. Also, for most of the Wilson administration, the U.S. military occupied Nicaragua, installed a Nicaraguan president that the U.S. preferred, and ensured that the country signed treaties favorable to the U.S.

Roosevelt administration

Policy
In an effort to denounce past U.S. interventionism and subdue any subsequent fears of Latin Americans, Roosevelt announced on March 4, 1933, during his inaugural address, "In the field of World policy, I would dedicate this nation to the policy of the good neighbor, the neighbor who resolutely respects himself and, because he does so, respects the rights of others, the neighbor who respects his obligations and respects the sanctity of his agreements in and with a World of neighbors." In order to create a friendly relationship between the United States and Central as well as South American countries, Roosevelt sought to abstain from asserting military force in the region. This position was affirmed by Cordell Hull, Roosevelt's Secretary of State at a conference of American states in Montevideo in December 1933. Hull said: "No country has the right to intervene in the internal or external affairs of another." Roosevelt then confirmed the policy in December of the same year: "The definite policy of the United States from now on is one opposed to armed intervention."

Impact

The Good Neighbor Policy terminated the U.S. Marines occupation of Haiti in 1934, led to the annulment of the Platt Amendment by the Treaty of Relations with Cuba in 1934, and the negotiation of compensation for Mexico's nationalization of foreign-owned oil assets in 1938.

The United States Maritime Commission contracted Moore-McCormack Lines to operate a "Good Neighbor fleet" of ten cargo ships and three recently laid-up ocean liners between the United States and South America. The passenger liners were the recently defunct Panama Pacific Line's , Virginia and Pennsylvania.

The policy sought to redefine the way Americans perceived Latin Americans, while at the same time maintaining hemispheric unity. In order to accomplish this, Roosevelt created the Office of the Coordinator of Inter-American Affairs (OCIAA) in August 1940 and appointed Nelson Rockefeller to head the organization. The OCIAA was essentially a propaganda tool used by the United States to define Latin American society, as they perceived it. One division within the OCIAA, the Motion Picture Division, was headed by John Hay Whitney, with the main intent to abolish preexisting stereotypes of Latin Americans that were prevalent throughout American society. Whitney was convinced of "the power that Hollywood films could exert in the two-pronged campaign to win the hearts and minds of Latin Americans and to convince Americans of the benefits of Pan-American friendship." In order to accomplish this, Whitney urged film studios to hire Latin Americans and to produce movies that placed Latin America in a favorable light. Further, he urged filmmakers to refrain from producing movies that perpetuated negative stereotypes. Historically, Latin Americans were lackadaisically portrayed as lazy, backwards and suspicious. One film star who emerged then was Carmen Miranda. Used as a product to promote positive hemispheric relations, her films, including The Gang's All Here, explicitly promoted the Good Neighbor policy.

Similarly, in 1941 Edmund A. Chester at CBS Radio collaborated with the OCIAA to create the "La Cadena de las Américas" (Network of the Americas) radio network to broadcast news and cultural programs which reflected Roosevelt's Good neighbor Policy and Pan-Americanism throughout Latin America during World War II. As a professional journalist, Chester insisted upon the presentation of accurate news programming as well as cultural programs which dispelled the negative stereotype of Americans toiling as automatons in a national industrial machine. Also, the policy's cultural impact included the launch of CBS Radio's Viva América and Hello Americans programs and the Walt Disney films Saludos Amigos (1942) and The Three Caballeros (1944).

By the end of World War II, Latin America was, according to one historian, the region of the world most supportive of American foreign policy.

Further impact 
By 1936 global peace was broken, as nations in parts of Europe, Asia, and Africa were at war. Against this background the United States called for a special meeting of the Pan-American Union. Held in Buenos Aires from December 3 to December 26, 1936, the Inter-American Conference for the Maintenance of Peace received great attention from the countries of the western hemisphere. Franklin D. Roosevelt attended the meeting in person and delivered a speech in which he said that American countries are determined to live in peace and that if there is any aggression from outside, the countries of the western hemisphere are fully prepared to negotiate for their common security and interests.

The important results of the Buenos Aires Conference in 1936 led to further developments at the Pan-American Conference of Lima 1938, where the Conference of American States agreed in a declaration to settle all disputes peacefully, to refrain from interfering in other countries' internal affairs, to deny recognition of territories seized, and make it illegal to collect debts by force. The declaration was to be known as the "Declaration of Lima".

1939 World's Fair 

The 1939 New York World's Fair was just the place to promote neighborly relations between the United States and Latin America. Placed against the backdrop of a growing Nazi threat, the World’s Fair was an attempt to escape from the looming prospect of war and to promote peace and interdependence between nations. With the fair boasting over 60 countries, with some coming from Latin America, it was the place to redefine negative Latin American stereotypes. Argentina, Brazil, Chile, Venezuela, Cuba, Mexico, Nicaragua, and the Pan American Union were all represented at the World’s Fair. Each country seized the opportunity to showcase their country and to make it more appealing to those around the world, especially in the United States. In their bid to increase cultural awareness at the World’s Fair, each country promoted tourism, and strived to compare itself to the United States in an effort to appeal to Americans.

Legacy
The era of the Good Neighbor Policy ended with the ramp-up of the Cold War in 1945, as the United States felt there was a greater need to protect the Western Hemisphere from Soviet influence. The changes conflicted with the Good Neighbor Policy's fundamental principle of non-intervention and led to a new wave of US involvement in Latin American affairs. Until the end of the Cold War the United States directly or indirectly attacked all suspected socialist or communist movements in the hope of ending the spread of Soviet influence. U.S. interventions and interference in this era included the CIA overthrow of Guatemala's President Jacobo Árbenz in 1954, the unsuccessful CIA-backed Bay of Pigs Invasion in Cuba in 1961, support for the 1964 Brazilian coup d'état which helped to remove from power democratically elected President João Goulart, the occupation of the Dominican Republic, in response to the Dominican Civil War, in 1965-1966, the CIA subversion of Chilean President Salvador Allende in 1970–1973, and support for the 1973 coup d'etat that removed Allende, and support for Operation Charly in Central America and Operation Condor in South America, and the CIA subversion of Nicaragua's Sandinista government from about 1981 to 1990.

After World War II, the Organization of American States was established in 1949. However, the U.S. began to shift its focus to aid and rebuilding efforts in Europe and Japan. These U.S. efforts largely neglected the Latin American countries, though U.S. investors and businessmen did have some stake in the nations to the South. In the late 1950s, United States strengthened relations with Latin America, launching the Inter-American Development Bank and later the Alliance for Progress. However, in the late 1960s, as part of the Cold War, the United States government provided support to right-wing dictatorships with Operation Condor. Also, in the context of the War on Drugs, the United States government has collaborated with local governments to fight cartels, for example with the Plan Colombia and the Mérida Initiative.

Good Neighbor Policy to Brazil

Brazil had the most important branch of the Office of Inter-American Affairs on the entire continent. In all, 13 regional offices were created in different Brazilian capitals. Given Brazil's strategic importance for World War II, the country was the target of an immense US propaganda effort, mainly through films, cartoons, and documentaries. According to one historian, from 1942 to 1945, relations between Brazil and the United States were intense. Many American artistic and intellectual personalities were in Brazil working on behalf of the Good Neighbor Policy, including Walt Disney, Orson Welles, Samuel G. Engel, Gregg Toland, and John Ford. During the war, US propaganda films were seen by over 70 million Brazilian viewers.

Good Neighbor Policy to Cuba

The Good Neighbor Policy caused the annulment of the Platt Amendment in 1934, though the U.S did continue to exert influence on Cuban affairs. In one notable example, the U.S government expressed to the Cuban government that it should increase American quotas for Cuban sugar under a trade agreement, with the idea that it would benefit Cuba’s local economy.

See also
 Anti-Americanism
 Cold War
 Colossus of the North
 Interventionism (politics)
 Latin America–United States relations
 Monroe Doctrine
 Roosevelt Corollary
 United States occupation of Haiti

References

Further reading
 Adams, Dale. "Saludos amigos: Hollywood and FDR's good neighbor policy." Quarterly Review of Film and Video 24.3 (2007): 289-295.
 Beck, Earl R. "The Good Neighbor Policy, 1933–1938", Historian 1#2 pp. 110–131 .
 Bryne, Alex. The Monroe Doctrine and United States National Security in the Early Twentieth Century (Springer Nature, 2020).
 Chavez, Tizoc. "'The One Bright Spot': Presidential Personal Diplomacy and the Good Neighbor Policy." Presidential Studies Quarterly (2021).

 Dallek, Robert. Franklin D. Roosevelt and American Foreign Policy, 1932-1945 (1995)  excerpt and text search
 Friedman, Max Paul. "The Good Neighbor Policy." Oxford Research Encyclopedia of Latin American History (2018), online.
 Friedman, Max Paul, and Tom Long. "Soft balancing in the Americas: Latin American opposition to US intervention, 1898–1936." International Security 40.1 (2015): 120-156. online
 Gellman, Irwin. Good Neighbor Diplomacy: United States Policies in Latin America, 1933-1945 (JHU Press, 2019).
 Koppes, Clayton R. "The good neighbor policy and the nationalization of Mexican oil: A reinterpretation." Journal of American History 69.1 (1982): 62-81. online

 McPherson,  Alan. "Herbert Hoover, Occupation Withdrawal, and the Good Neighbor Policy." Presidential Studies Quarterly 44.4 (2014): 623-639. online  
 Pederson, William D. ed. A Companion to Franklin D. Roosevelt (2011) online pp 542–63, covers FDR's policies
 Pike, Fredrick B. FDR's Good Neighbor Policy: Sixty Years of Generally Gentle Chaos (2010)  excerpt and text search
 Stuckey, Mary E. The Good Neighbor: Franklin D. Roosevelt and the Rhetoric of American Power (Michigan State University Press; 2013) 376 pages; Explores the metaphor of the "good neighbor" as key to FDR's rhetoric in and beyond foreign affairs. excerpt and text search
 Valim, Alexandre Busko. Brazil, the United States, and the Good Neighbor Policy: the triumph of persuasion during World War II. Lanham, Maryland: Lexington Books, 2019. 271 pages. excerpt and text search. New sources related to propaganda and cinema.
 van den Berk, Jorrit, ed. Becoming a Good Neighbor among Dictators: The U.S. Foreign Service in Guatemala, El Salvador, and Honduras (2018) excerpt

 Wood, Bryce. The Making of the Good Neighbor Policy. New York: Columbia University Press 1961. Classic work.

External links

Banana Wars
Cuba–United States relations
Mexico–United States relations
History of United States expansionism
History of the foreign relations of the United States
Foreign policy doctrines of the United States
Presidency of Franklin D. Roosevelt
United States–South American relations
United States–Central American relations
United States–Caribbean relations
1933 in international relations
History of diplomacy
1933 in American politics